Nero Nemesis is the eighth studio album by French rapper Booba, which was released on 4 December 2015 by AZ and Tallac Records.

Track listing
 "Walabok" (3:05)
 "Talion" (4:02)
 "Zer" (featuring Siboy & Benash) (4:40)
 "92i Veyron" (3:37)
 "Validée" (featuring Benash) (3:25)
 "Attila" (2:48)
 "Charbon" (3:38)
 "U2K" (featuring Twinsmatic) (4:06)
 "Génération Assassin" (2:23)
 "Pinocchio" (featuring Damso & Gato) (4:20)
 "Comme les autres" (4:38)
 "Habibi" (4:05)
 "4G" (3:55)

Charts

Weekly charts

Year-end charts

Certifications

References

Booba albums
2015 albums
French-language albums